Wayne Farnham is an Australian politician, currently the Liberal Party member for the electoral district of Narracan in the Victorian Legislative Assembly.

References

Living people
Year of birth missing (living people)
Members of the Victorian Legislative Assembly
Liberal Party of Australia members of the Parliament of Victoria
21st-century Australian politicians